Samuel Anderson Schweyer (25 September 1929 – 18 August 2012) was a Cuban hurdler who competed in the 1952 Summer Olympics. He won a bronze medal in the 100 metres hurdles at the 1951 Pan American Games.

He was a loving father, husband, brother, son, grandfather, uncle, and friend who dedicated his life to God and the Seventh-Day Adventist Church.

References

1929 births
2012 deaths
Cuban male hurdlers
Olympic athletes of Cuba
Athletes (track and field) at the 1952 Summer Olympics
Athletes (track and field) at the 1951 Pan American Games
Athletes (track and field) at the 1955 Pan American Games
Pan American Games bronze medalists for Cuba
Pan American Games medalists in athletics (track and field)
Central American and Caribbean Games gold medalists for Cuba
Competitors at the 1954 Central American and Caribbean Games
Central American and Caribbean Games medalists in athletics
Medalists at the 1951 Pan American Games
20th-century Cuban people